Colin Falconer may refer to: 

 Colin Falconer (bishop) (1623–1686), Scottish bishop
 Colin Falconer (writer) (born 1953), English novelist

See also
 Falconer (surname)